Crete earthquake may refer to:

 365 Crete earthquake
 1303 Crete earthquake
 1630 Crete earthquake
 1810 Crete earthquake
 2021 Crete earthquake (disambiguation)

See also
 1856 Heraklion earthquake